The Bi-State League was an American baseball Class D level minor league which operated in 1915.  It was the successor of the Wisconsin–Illinois League and was represented by five teams from Illinois and one from Wisconsin. The Bi-State folded during the 1915 season.

History
The six–team Bi-State League was formed for the 1915 season with the Aurora Foxes, Elgin Watch Makers, Freeport Pretzels, Ottawa Indians, Racine Belles and Streator Boosters as charter members under the direction of president B.M. Parsons. The league evolved from the Wisconsin-Illinois League, which had Racine as a member and folded after the 1914 season.

After beginning play on May 11, 1515, the Bi-State League disbanded on July 7, 1915 after the Elgin and Aurora franchises folded.

The Streator Boosters were in 1st place in the league standings when the Bi-State League folded. With a 30–18 record, Streator was 1.0 game ahead of the 2nd place Racine Belles (30–20) in the final standings. They were followed by Elgin Watch Makers (27–26), Aurora Foxes (25–27), Freeport Pretzels (23–29) and Ottawa Indians (20–35) in the final standings.

List of teams 
Aurora, Illinois:  Aurora Foxes
Elgin, Illinois:  Elgin Watch Makers
Freeport, Illinois:  Freeport Pretzels
Ottawa, Illinois:  Ottawa Indians
Racine, Wisconsin:  Racine Belles
Streator, Illinois:  Streator Boosters

1915 Standings & Statistics
1915 Bi-State Leagueschedule
 Elgin & Aurora disbanded July 5. The league disbanded July 7.

References

Sources
The Encyclopedia of Minor League Baseball: Second Edition:
This article is based on the "Bi-States League" article at Baseball-Reference.com Bullpen. The Bullpen is a wiki, and its content is available under the GNU Free Documentation License.

Defunct minor baseball leagues in the United States
Baseball leagues in Illinois
Baseball leagues in Wisconsin
Sports leagues established in 1915
Sports leagues disestablished in 1915